Sofa King is a pun on "so fucking" and may specifically refer to:

 "Sofa King" (song), a song in the Danger Doom album The Mouse and the Mask
 Sofa King, a gag name of a hypothetical furniture store used during a Saturday Night Live skit

See also
 Sofa King Cool (album), third studio album of Diesel Boy, a pop-punk rock band
 Sofa King Killer, a former American sludge metal band from Akron, Ohio
 So F**king Rock Live, DVD by Australian musician and stand-up comedian Tim Minchin
 Sofa (disambiguation)